Kirill Kozhevnikov may refer to:

Kirill Kozhevnikov (sailor) (born 1926), sailor at the 1952 Olympics
Kirill Kozhevnikov (ice hockey) (born 1999), Russian ice hockey player